Saburtalo might refer to:

Saburtalo Pantheon, burial site in Tbilisi, Georgia
Saburtalo Line, metro line in Tbilisi, Georgia
FC Saburtalo Tbilisi, football club in Tbilisi, Georgia
Saburtalo District, district in Tbilisi, Georgia